Emma Martin may refer to:

 Emma Marshall (1830–1899), née Martin, English children's author
 Emma Martin (socialist) (1811/12–1851), British author, socialist and free thinker
 Emma May Martin (1865–1957), Canadian artist
 Emma Martín (born 2002), Spanish footballer